The Reserve Long Service and Good Conduct Medal was the Long Service Medal of the reserve forces of the Royal Navy.  The medal was presented for 15 or 12 years of service by Petty Officers and ratings of the Royal Naval Reserve, Royal Naval Volunteer Reserve, Royal Naval Auxiliary Sick Berth Reserve, Royal Fleet Reserve, and Royal Naval Wireless Auxiliary Reserve.  Established in 1909, the medal was replaced by the Volunteer Reserves Service Medal.

Medal design
The medal is silver  in diameter. The obverse bears the effigy of the reigning sovereign of the period.  The first two, Edward VII and George V are in the uniform of the Admiral of the Fleet.  The later monarchs' effigies are the coinage type profiles.  The reverse depicts HMS Dreadnought  with the motto DIUTURNE FIDELIS (Faithful Over Time) underneath.  The ribbons of the forces varied over time and by force.  In 1957, the Royal Naval Reserve and Royal Naval Volunteer Reserve were merged as the Royal Naval Reserve, and assumed a common ribbon.

References

Military awards and decorations of the United Kingdom
Long and Meritorious Service Medals of Britain and the Commonwealth